Eusceptis is a genus of bird dropping moths of the family Noctuidae.

Species
 Eusceptis effusa Druce, 1889
 Eusceptis extensa Strand, 1913
 Eusceptis flavifrimbriata
 Eusceptis incomptilinea Todd, 1971
 Eusceptis irretita Hübner, 1823
 Eusceptis koehleri Todd, 1966
 Eusceptis lelae Todd, 1966
 Eusceptis obscura Schaus, 1898
 Eusceptis paraguayensis Draudt, 1939
 Eusceptis robertae Todd, 1966
 Eusceptis splendens Druce, 1896

References
 Eusceptis at Markku Savela's Lepidoptera and Some Other Life Forms
 Natural History Museum Lepidoptera genus database

Acontiinae